Eugenia erythrophylla is a species of plant in the family Myrtaceae. It is endemic to South Africa.  It is threatened by habitat loss.

References

Endemic flora of South Africa
erythrophylla
Near threatened plants
Taxonomy articles created by Polbot
Plants described in 1972